Alumni Oxonienses: The Members of the University of Oxford is a biographical reference work by Joseph Foster (1844–1905), published by Oxford University Press, listing the alumni of the University of Oxford. Foster's work was compiled principally from the colleges' matriculation registers and the university archives, but it also relies on numerous printed and other sources.

Publications

Alumni Oxonienses (1500–1714) (two volumes, 1891–92): online version at british-history.ac.uk
 Alumni Oxonienses (1715–1886) (two volumes, 1891–92): 
 Surnames beginning A-D online version
 Surnames beginning E-K online version
 Surnames beginning L-R online version
 Surnames beginning S-Z online version
Oxford Men and their Colleges (1880–1892) (two volumes, 1893): online version

See also 
 Alumni Cantabrigienses

1891 non-fiction books
1892 non-fiction books
1893 non-fiction books
Alumni Oxonienses
British biographical dictionaries
Oxford University Press books
 
Terminology of the University of Oxford